Beta (B, β) is the second letter of the Greek alphabet.

Beta or BETA may also refer to:

Arts, entertainment, and media

Films
 Beta (film), a 1992 Bollywood film directed by Indra Kumar
 Beta Test (film), a 2016 American science fiction film directed by Nicholas Gyeney
 The Beta Test, a 2021 American dark comedy film directed by Jim Cummings

Fictional entities
 BETA (Muv-Luv) (Beings of the Extra Terrestrial origin which is Adversary of human race), an alien race from the video game series Muv-Luv
 β, a classification of strength in the Earthbound, or Mother, series of Nintendo role-playing games
 Beta, a wolf character in the animated film Storks
 BETA, an organization in the 1986 TV series The Adventures of the Galaxy Rangers
 Beta (The Walking Dead), an antagonist in the Walking Dead comic series
 Beta Hirogen, the second in command of a Hirogen hunting party, as seen in Star Trek: Voyager
 Beta Quadrant, one of four quadrants in the galaxy in Star Trek

Other uses in arts, entertainment, and media
 Beta (Magic: The Gathering), the second (revised) part of the first set of the card game Magic: The Gathering
 Beta chord
 Beta News Agency, Serbian independent news agency
 Beta Recordings, a record label headed by John B
 Lifetime (TV network), pre-launch branded as BETA
 beta, a combat robot competing in BattleBots
 Beta, a mountain biking magazine and website launched by Outside (company) in 2021

Computing
 BETA (programming language), a programming language
 Beta release, or betaware, a phase in software development before an official release
 Perpetual beta, software or a system that never leaves the beta development stage

Mathematics, finance, and statistics
 Beta (finance), the β coefficient in the capital asset pricing model
 β, the probability of a Type II error in statistics; See Type I and type II errors 
 β-reduction, a reduction rule for lambda calculus
 Beta distribution, in statistics, a family of continuous probability distributions
 Beta function, a special function also known as the Euler integral of the first kind
 Beta invariant, of a matroid
 Dirichlet beta function
 Eratosthenes, Greek mathematician nicknamed Beta (Βῆτα)
 Standardized coefficient or beta coefficient, in statistics, the estimate of an analysis performed on variables that have been standardized so that they have variances of 1

Organisations
 Beta (motorcycle manufacturer), an Italian off-road motorcycles manufacturer
 BETA Cargo, a defunct Brazilian airline
 Beta Technologies, an America electric aircraft manufacturer
 British Equestrian Trade Association, a membership organisation in the United Kingdom
 Broadcasting and Entertainment Trades Alliance, sometimes known by the acronym "BETA"
 National Beta Club, a high school honor society
 South Texas Business Education & Technology Academy (BETA)

Places
 Beta, Ohio, a ghost town in the United States
 Beța, a village in Lopadea Nouă Commune, Alba County, Romania
 Beta, a village in Mugeni Commune, Harghita County, Romania
 Beta Israel, a name given to Jewish communities that occupied territories of the Aksumite and Ethiopian (Habesh or Abyssinia) empires
 Beta (Olt), a tributary of the Olt in Harghita County, Romania
 Beta, a tributary of the Târnava Mare in Harghita County, Romania

Psychology
 Beta movement, a perceptual illusion whereby two or more still images are combined by the brain into surmised motion
 Beta quadra, one of the four quadras in socionics
 Type-beta, a personality type now commonly referred to as type-B; See Type A and Type B personality theory

Science

Biology and medicine
 Beta (plant), a genus of flowering plants, mostly referred to as beets
 Beta (grape), a variety of North American grape
 β1 and β2, or beta-1 and beta-2, adrenergic receptors
 Beta, a rank in a community of social animals; See Alpha
 Beta carbon, in organic chemistry—the second carbon atom in a chain when counting from a functional group; See Alpha and beta carbon
 Beta cell, a type of cell in the pancreas, which produces insulin
 Beta sheet, a secondary protein structure
 Beta-endorphin, a kind of neurotransmitter
 SARS-CoV-2 Beta variant, one of the variants of SARS-CoV-2, the virus that causes COVID-19

Physics
 Beta (plasma physics), the ratio of thermal to magnetic pressure in plasma
 Beta (velocity), the speed of an object relative to the speed of light in special relativity.
 β, a symbol for compressibility, a measure of the relative volume change of a fluid or solid as a response to a pressure change
 Beta function (physics), also β(g)—a function in quantum field theory
 Beta particle, a name used to refer to high-energy electrons (β−) or positrons (β+) emitted by certain types of radioactive nuclei
 Phase Constant (β), in electromagnetics and electrical engineering, used in the theory of plane waves; See Propagation constant
 Precursor yield fraction, leading to delayed neutrons in nuclear reactors
 Thermodynamic beta, in thermodynamics and statistical mechanics—a numerical quantity related to the thermodynamic temperature of a system

Other uses in science
 Hurricane Beta, a 2005 hurricane
 Tropical Storm Beta (2020), a 2020 tropical storm

Sports
 Beta (climbing), climbing jargon that designates information about a climb
 Beta Ethniki, the second tier division of the Greek football (soccer) league

Technology
 Beta (time signal), a time signal service broadcast in the very low frequency range in Russia
 Beta, the common-emitter current gain of a bipolar junction transistor
 Betacam, a family of half-inch professional videotape products developed by Sony
 Betamax, home videocassette tape recording format developed by Sony

Other uses
 Advance Bi Beta, a Swiss paraglider design
 Beta male (slang), a pejorative term for a man considered as weak and emasculated
 Lancia Beta, a car produced by Lancia
 Beta reader, a person who critiques a written work prior to public release
 Voiced bilabial fricative (β), the voiced bilabial fricative symbol of the International Phonetic Alphabet

See also
 ß, a German letter that resembles β
 B3ta, a British humour webcommunity
 Betta, a genus of fish, often misspelled “beta”
 Coral the Betta, a character in the Sonic the Hedgehog comics by Archie